Maria Alexandrovna may refer to:

 Grand Duchess Maria Alexandrovna of Russia (1799–1800), daughter of Alexander I of Russia
 Maria Alexandrovna (Marie of Hesse) (1824–1880), princess of the Grand Duchy of Hesse and Empress consort of Tsar Alexander II of Russia
 Grand Duchess Maria Alexandrovna of Russia (1853–1920), daughter of the above, also a Duchess of Edinburgh and Duchess of Saxe-Coburg and Gotha
 Maria Alexandrovna Ulyanova (1835–1916)

See also 
 Maria of Russia (disambiguation)